Katy  is a village in the administrative district of Gmina Jarocin, within Nisko County, Subcarpathian Voivodeship, in south-eastern Poland.

References

Katy